Washington Valley Schoolhouse, also known as the Little Red Schoolhouse, is located in the Washington Valley section of Morris Township, Morris County, New Jersey, United States. The schoolhouse was built in 1869 and was added to the National Register of Historic Places on October 15, 1973. It is also a contributing property of the Washington Valley Historic District.

See also
National Register of Historic Places listings in Morris County, New Jersey

References

External links
 

School buildings completed in 1869
School buildings on the National Register of Historic Places in New Jersey
Buildings and structures in Morris County, New Jersey
National Register of Historic Places in Morris County, New Jersey
Historic district contributing properties in New Jersey
Historic district contributing properties in Morris County, New Jersey
Individually listed contributing properties to historic districts on the National Register in New Jersey
1869 establishments in New Jersey
New Jersey Register of Historic Places
Morris Township, New Jersey
Brick buildings and structures